Hendrik van der Meer (12 January 1916 – 25 April 1985) was a Dutch rower who won the European title in the double scull event in 1947, together with Tom Neumeier. They also competed at the 1948 Summer Olympics in London in the men's double sculls where they were eliminated in the round one repêchage.

References

1916 births
1985 deaths
Dutch male rowers
Olympic rowers of the Netherlands
Rowers at the 1948 Summer Olympics
People from Heerhugowaard
European Rowing Championships medalists
Sportspeople from North Holland
20th-century Dutch people